Members of DC Comics' All-Star Squadron, a superhero team made up of virtually every DC-owned character from the Golden Age of Comic Books and several newly retconned into that time period.

Membership

No previous affiliation
 Air Wave (Lawrence Jordan)
 Amazing-Man (Will Everett)
 Aquaman (Arthur Curry) (Pre-Crisis only)
 Blackhawk (Janos Prohaska)
 Blue Beetle (Dan Garrett) 
 Blue Boys (Tubby and Toughy)
 Captain Triumph (Lance Gallant)
 Commander Steel (Henry Heywood)
 Captain X (Richard O'Dare)
 Dan the Dyna-Mite
 Dr. Occult (Richard Occult)  
 Doll Girl (Martha Roberts)
 Firebrand (Danette Reilly)
 Gay Ghost (Keith Everett)
 Great Defender (Stormy Foster)
 Ghost Patrol
 Guardian (Jim Harper) 
 Hawkgirl (Shiera Sanders) 
 Harlequin (Molly Mayne)
 Hercules (Joe Hercules)
 Hop Harrigan 
 Invisible Hood (Kent Thurston)
 Johnny Quick (Johnny Chambers)
 Judomaster (Hadley "Rip" Jagger) (Post-Crisis only)
 The King (King Standish)
 Liberty Belle (Libby Lawrence-Chambers)
 Little Boy Blue (Tommy Rogers)
 Little Miss Redhead (Janie)
 Manhunter (Paul Kirk)
 Merlin the Magician (Jock Kellog)
 Merry, Girl of 1000 Gimmicks (Merry Pemberton)
 Mister America/Americommando (Tex Thompson)
 Neon the Unknown (Tom Corbet)
 Quicksilver 
 Red Tornado (Ma Hunkel)
 Robotman (Robert Crane/Paul Dennis) 
 Sandy the Golden Boy (Sanderson Hawkins)
 Sargon the Sorcerer (John Sargent)
 Solomon Grundy (Cyrus Gold)
 Speed Saunders (Cyril Saunders) - never shown as a member in a published comic.
 Tarantula (Jonathan Law)
 Tiger (Tanaka) (Post-Crisis only)
 TNT (Thomas N. Thomas)
 Tor, the Magic Master (Jimmy Slade)
 Whip (Rodney Gaynor) 
 Wildfire (Carol Vance Martin)
 Zatara (Giovanni Zatara)

Seven Soldiers of Victory
 Alias the Spider (Tom Ludlow Hallaway) (Post-Crisis only) 
 Billy Gunn (Post-Crisis only)
 Crimson Avenger (Lee Travis) 
 Green Arrow (Oliver Queen) (Pre-Crisis only) 
 Shining Knight (Justin Arthur)  
 Speedy (Roy Harper) (Pre-Crisis only)
 Star-Spangled Kid (Sylvester Pemberton, Jr.) 
 Stripesy (Pat Dugan)
 Stuff the Chinatown Kid (Daniel Jimmy Leong) (Post-Crisis only)
 Vigilante (Greg Saunders) 
 Wing (Wing How)

Freedom Fighters
 Black Condor (Richard Grey, Jr./Thomas Wright)
 Doll Man (Darrell Dane)
 Firebrand (Rod Reilly) 
 Human Bomb (Roy Lincoln)
 Jester (Chuck Lane)
 Magno the Magnetic Man (Tom Dalton)
 Manhunter (Dan Richards)
 Thor the Thunder Dog 
 Midnight (Dave Clark)
 Miss America (Joan Dale-Trevor)
 Phantom Lady (Sandra Knight)
 Plastic Man (Patrick "Eel" O'Brian)
 Ray (Lanford "Happy" Terrill)
 Red Bee (Rick Raleigh) 
 Uncle Sam

Justice Society of America
 Atom (Al Pratt)
 Batman (Bruce Wayne) (Pre-Crisis only)
 Dr. Fate (Kent Nelson) 
 Dr. Mid-Nite (Charles McNider)
 Flash (Jay Garrick)
 Green Lantern (Alan Scott) 
 Hawkman (Carter Hall) 
 Hourman (Rex Tyler) 
 Johnny Thunder and Thunderbolt (Yz)
 Mister Terrific (Terry Sloane)
 Robin (Richard Grayson) (Pre-Crisis only)
 Sandman (Wesley Dodds)
 Spectre (Jim Corrigan) 
 Starman (Ted Knight)  
 Superman (Clark Kent/Kal-L) (Pre-Crisis only)
 Wildcat (Ted Grant)
 Wonder Woman (Princess Diana/Diana Prince) (Pre-Crisis/Post-Flashpoint only)
 Wonder Woman (Queen Hippolyta) (Post-Crisis/Pre-Infinite Crisis only)

Young All-Stars (post-Crisis only)
 Dan the Dyna-Mite (Daniel Dunbar)
 Flying Fox
 Fury (Helena Kosmatos)
 Iron Munro (Arnold Munro)
 Neptune Perkins 
 Tigress (Paula Brooks)
 Tsunami (Miya Shimada)

Squadron of Justice (post-Crisis only)
 Bulletman (Jim Barr)
 Bulletgirl (Susan Kent)
 Commando Yank (Chase Yale)
 Ibis the Invincible (Amentep)
 Minute-Man (Jack Weston)
 Mister Scarlet (Brian Butler)
 Phantom Eagle (Mickey Malone)
 Pinky the Whiz Kid (Pinky Butler)
 Spy Smasher (Alan Armstrong)

Allies

No previous affiliation
 Arak, Son of Thunder (Bright-Sky-After-Storm)
 Black Pirate (Jon Valor)
 Golden Gladiator (Marcus of Rome)
 Miss Liberty (Bess Lynn)
 Silent Knight (Brian Kent)
 Strong Bow
 Super-Chief (Flying Stag)
 Trigger Twins (Walt and Wayne Trigger)
 Valda the Iron Maiden

Marvel Family (pre-Crisis only)
 Captain Marvel (Billy Batson)
 Captain Marvel Jr. (Freddy Freeman)
 Mary Marvel (Mary Batson)

Infinity, Inc.
 Brainwave Jr. (Hank King Jr.)
 Fury (Lyta Trevor)
 Jade (Jennifer-Lynn Hayden)
 Northwind (Norda Cantrell)
 Nuklon (Al Rothstein)
 Obsidian (Todd Rice)
 Silver Scarab (Hector Hall)

The Young Allies (post-Crisis only)
 The Squire (Percy Sheldrake)
 Fireball (Sonya Chuikov)
 Kuei
 Phantasmo (Jean-Marc de Villars)

Newsboy Legion
 Tommy Tompkins
 Big Words
 Gabby
 Scrapper

References

All-Star Squadron members